Pats Peak is an independent alpine ski resort located in Henniker, New Hampshire, in the United States. It is roughly a 90-minute drive from Boston, Massachusetts.

The four Patenaude brothers bought the original  plot of land for the Peak from their father, Merle Patenaude. It has been owned continuously by the Patenaude family since it opened, with three of the original owners selling their parts of the land to the fourth.

Trails and lifts 
Most trails are named after winds, with names such as Cyclone, Hurricane, Twister and Tornado. The trail network is 50% novice, 21% intermediate, 12% advanced, and 17% expert. Ski magazine said it has the best slalom skiing terrain in New Hampshire (FIS Race Trail, Expert). The mountain contains two or three (depending on conditions) terrain parks, and nine official glades.

Pats Peak has an alpine race team in the Central Division of the NHARA racing league. The team encompasses J6, J5, J4, J3, J2, and J1 age groups. The team mostly is coached by volunteers.

In the 2013-14 season, Pats Peak opened an expansion on the east side of Craney Hill. Named Cascade Basin, it includes a triple chair lift, covering 370 vertical feet. In 2017, Pats Peak installed a used CTEC Triple Chairlift to replace the aging Peak Double Chairlift. The new Peak Triple was formerly the Snowdance Triple at Ascutney Mountain Resort in Vermont. 

Pats Peak has six chairlifts and two magic carpets. There is also a rope tow in one of the terrain parks.

References

External links
 

Buildings and structures in Merrimack County, New Hampshire
Ski areas and resorts in New Hampshire
Tourist attractions in Merrimack County, New Hampshire
Henniker, New Hampshire